The School of Public and International Affairs (SPIA) at Virginia Tech offers graduate and undergraduate education in the fields of public administration, public policy, international affairs, urban affairs, and urban & regional planning. It has three campuses throughout Virginia: Arlington; Blacksburg and Richmond.

History

The School of Public and International Affairs (SPIA) was approved by the Virginia Tech Board of Visitors in 1996 as a collaboration of five departments and programs in two colleges to develop interdisciplinary instruction, research and outreach initiatives related to public policy, planning, and administration and globalization and international development.

SPIA is one of the schools in the Virginia Tech College of Liberal Arts and Human Sciences. SPIA houses three programs:
 Government and International Affairs (GIA)
 Urban Affairs and Planning (UAP)
 Public Administration and Policy (CPAP)

Programs

Center for Public Administration and Policy

The Center for Public Administration and Policy (CPAP) has three locations in Arlington, Blacksburg and Richmond, Virginia.  CPAP integrates the challenges of governing with the scholarship of public administration and public policy. CPAP offers doctoral and master's degree programs as well as graduate certificates. The majority of CPAP students take classes on a part-time basis, while working full-time in a wide variety of federal, regional, and local government positions, as well as positions in consulting and the non-profit sector. CPAP offers the Master of Public Administration (MPA) and Ph.D. degrees. Certificates are available in three fields: Homeland Security; Local Government Management; Public and Nonprofit Financial Management.

Urban Affairs and Planning
The Urban Affairs and Planning program has locations in Arlington and Blacksburg that offers an interdisciplinary, comparative, hands-on approach to instruction and research in two undergraduate degrees (B.A. in Public and Urban Affairs and B.S. in Environmental Policy and Planning), an accredited masters in Urban and Regional Planning (MURP), and a doctoral program in Planning, Governance & Globalization (PGG).

Government and International Affairs
The Government and International Affairs program has locations in Arlington and Blacksburg that offers a Master of Public and International Affairs (MPIA) and a Ph.D. in Governance and Globalization with an international affairs and cultural geo-politics focus. The MPIA is a 36-credit academic-oriented master's degree with a focus on international politics, critical geopolitics, international political economy, and cultural identity politics.

CLAHS Affiliated Departments
Affiliated Departments in the College of Liberal Arts and Human Sciences (CLAHS):

 Political Science
 Geography
 International Studies
 Science and Technology Studies (joined in 2000)
 Agricultural and Applied Economics (joined in 2000)

National Capital Region

In 1969 the university launched new locations within the Virginia Tech National Capital Region (NCR). These facilities serves as a hub in the Washington metropolitan area for its students and alumni. As of 2015, the NCR offers graduate programs in Public Administration, Policy, Government, and International Affairs.

In the summer of 2019, SPIA moved its Washington D.C. metro area campus from its Old Town Alexandria site to the Virginia Tech Research Center located in Arlington, Virginia.

Rankings
Virginia Tech's School of Public and International Affairs has received the following rankings:

Public Affairs: No. 39 in the nation for Graduate Public Affairs in the 2020 U.S. News & World Report
Urban Planning: No. 22 in the nation in Planetizen's Top 25 Schools For Urban Planners
Public Management Administration: No. 15 for Best Graduate Schools in 2015 U.S. News & World Report
Public Administration: No. 22 in the nation in Top Management Degree's Top 25 Master's of Public Administration Programs

Research
In research and outreach, SPIA members lead a number of interdisciplinary efforts:
International Refugee Research Project
Institute for Policy and Governance

Administration

SPIA is administered by a director who is advised by an SPIA Executive Committee made up of the three program chairs along with one other faculty member from each program.

References

External links
 http://www.spia.vt.edu/

Virginia Tech